The 1957 NCAA University Division baseball season, play of college baseball in the United States organized by the National Collegiate Athletic Association (NCAA) began in the spring of 1957.  The season progressed through the regular season and concluded with the 1957 College World Series.  The College World Series, held for the eleventh time in 1957, consisted of one team from each of eight geographical districts and was held in Omaha, Nebraska at Johnny Rosenblatt Stadium as a double-elimination tournament.  California claimed the championship.

Realignment
Prior to the 1957 baseball season, the NCAA divided into two divisions: the University Division for larger schools and the College Division for smaller schools.

Conference winners
This is a partial list of conference champions from the 1957 season.  Each of the eight geographical districts chose, by various methods, the team that would represent them in the NCAA Tournament.  12 teams earned automatic bids by winning their conference championship while 11 teams earned at-large selections.

Conference standings
The following is an incomplete list of conference standings:

College World Series

The 1957 season marked the eleventh NCAA Baseball Tournament, which culminated with the eight team College World Series.  The College World Series was held in Omaha, Nebraska.  The eight teams played a double-elimination format, with California claiming their second championship with a 1–0 win over Penn State in the final.

Award winners

All-America team

References